Loch Davan is a small, triangular, freshwater loch approximately  northeast of Ballater, Scotland and lying immediately north of  Loch Kinord.
The loch sits within the Muir of Dinnet National Nature Reserve.

Flora and fauna
Due to its shallowness, light penetrates to the loch floor. Consequently, many species of aquatic plants exist including water lobelia, quillwort and shoreweed. Around the perimeter reeds, sedges, horsetails, bulrushes and willow scrub are found.  The loch is also home to pike, otters, migrating geese and other wildfowl.

Archaeology
The remains of a medieval moated homestead, known as The Heugh are visible on the northern shore of the loch. The Heugh is thought to have been the Hall of Logy Rothwayne, the headquarters of Andrew de Moray during the Battle of Culblean in 1335.

Survey
The loch was surveyed on 10 July 1905 by T.N. Johnston and L.W. Collett and later charted  as part of the Sir John Murray's Bathymetrical Survey of Fresh-Water Lochs of Scotland 1897-1909.

References

Davan
Davan
Dee Basin